Li Rui (8 December 1768 in Suzhou – 30 June 1817 in Suzhou) was a Chinese mathematician. Li discovered independently an equivalent version of what is known today as Descartes' rule of signs.

References
Joseph Warren Dauben and Christoph J. Scriba, eds., Writing the history of mathematics: its historical development, Birkhäuser, 2002, p. 303.

1768 births
1817 deaths
Mathematicians from Jiangsu
18th-century Chinese mathematicians
19th-century Chinese mathematicians
Historians of mathematics
Scientists from Suzhou
Qing dynasty people